J. Vinton "Vint" Lawrence (June 25, 1939 – April 9, 2016) was an artist and U.S. Central Intelligence Agency paramilitary officer from their elite Special Activities Division. Under the name of "James Vinton", he was stationed in Laos from 1962 to 1966 and had a close relationship with the Hmong leader Vang Pao in the U.S. war in Southeast Asia. Lawrence's CIA colleague in Laos was the CIA paramilitary expert Anthony Poshepny (aka "Tony Poe").

Lawrence was married to National Public Radio reporter Anne Garrels.  His letters to her during her time in Baghdad, Iraq, during the 2003 U.S. invasion of that country, are included in her book, Naked in Baghdad.  He toured with her and shared the podium with her during her book readings.  He and his wife received an AudioFile Earphones Award for their narration. An artist by profession, he occasionally wrote about U.S. foreign policy issues. As an illustrator and caricaturist he was regularly employed by The New Republic and The Washington Post. He died on April 9, 2016.

Lawrence was the great-grandson of Charles A. Coffin, cofounder and first president of General Electric corporation.

See also
Laotian Civil War
James William Lair
Vietnam War
Jerry Daniels
Kingdom of Laos
North Vietnamese invasion of Laos
Lao Veterans of America
Laos Memorial
Anthony Poshepny
Alfred W. McCoy
Nugan Hand Bank

References
 (Not yet utilized) Grant, Zalin. (1991). Facing the Phoenix: The CIA and the Political Defeat of the United States in Vietnam, W W Norton & Co Inc. ISBNs 0393029255, .

Notes

External links
"Cambodia and Laos", Vietnam Online, PBS, March 29, 2005.
David S. Robarge (Reviewer), "Lost Crusader: The Secret Wars of CIA Director William Colby.  John Prados. New York: Oxford University Press, 2003".
"CIA's Paramilitary Operations", undated, accessed November 2005.
Richard S Ehrlich, "Death of a dirty fighter", Asia Times Online'',  July 8, 2003.

1939 births
2016 deaths
People of the Laotian Civil War
People of the Central Intelligence Agency
CIA personnel of the Vietnam War